Ronald George Brand (born January 13, 1940) is an American former professional baseball player. He played in Major League Baseball as a catcher, and was an original member of the Montreal Expos.

Career

Pittsburgh Pirates
He hit his first major league home run on June 20, off Denny Lemaster of the Milwaukee Braves.

Houston Astros

John Bateman was Houston's Opening Day starting catcher in 1965, however, he soon lost his starting job to Brand. On August 18, Brand hit his second home run of the season, and the third of his career. He never hit another major league home run.

In , Bateman won back the starting catcher job, and Brand became the back-up.

Montreal Expos
On October 14, 1968, Bateman was drafted by the Montreal Expos as the sixth overall pick in the 1968 Major League Baseball expansion draft; 52 picks later, the Expos selected Brand, and the two resumed their platoon in Montreal.

This platoon only lasted one season as in  Brand assumed more of a utility infielder role. In , Brand only caught two innings, however, made 22 appearances at shortstop.

References

External links

1940 births
Living people
American expatriate baseball players in Canada
Bakersfield Dodgers players
Baseball players from Los Angeles
Burlington Bees players
Clinton Pirates players
Columbus Jets players
Houston Astros players
Kinston Eagles players
Major League Baseball catchers
Minor league baseball managers
Montreal Expos players
New York Yankees scouts
Oklahoma City 89ers players
Peninsula Whips players
Pittsburgh Pirates players
San Jose Pirates players
Roswell Rockets players
North Hollywood High School alumni